Petrus van der Walt Vermeulen (born 11 November 1988) is a former South African rugby union footballer.

He retired during 2014, aged just 25, due to persistent injuries and to concentrate on his career as a doctor.

References

Living people
1988 births
South African rugby union players
Rugby union locks
Rugby union players from Bloemfontein
Cheetahs (rugby union) players
Free State Cheetahs players
Afrikaner people
South African people of Dutch descent
Alumni of Grey College, Bloemfontein